New York State Route 435 may refer to:

New York State Route 435 (1940s) in Herkimer County.
New York State Route 435 (reserved) a reserved designation in Fulton County along current NY 29A from NY 10 to NY 30A.